Backstage Musikk A/S is a Norwegian chain of music stores.

They mainly sell guitars, basses and pianos. Fender, Gibson, Martin, Taylor, Yamaha, Roland, Korg, Nord Electro, Marshall and Vox are their main brands. The chain was established in 2009 in Sandvika.

References

External links
Official website: www.Backstagemusikk.no

Musical instrument retailers
Music retailers of Norway